The Treehouse Trolls is a video series related to Troll dolls:
Treehouse Trolls Birthday Day
Treehouse Trolls Forest of Fun and Wonder